Games People Play may refer to:

 Games People Play (book), a 1964 psychology book by Eric Berne

Music 
 "Games People Play" (The Alan Parsons Project song), 1980
 "Games People Play" (Joe South song), 1968; covered by Inner Circle, 1994
 "Games People Play" (The Spinners song), also known as "They Just Can't Stop It (The Games People Play)", 1975
 Games People Play (album), a 1993 album by Pink Cream 69
 The Games People Play (Paul Lamb album), 2012
 Games People Play, an album by The PeeChees

Television 
 Games People Play (1980 TV series), a 1980–1981 American sports show that was broadcast on NBC
 Games People Play (2019 TV series), a 2019 American drama series that airs on BET

Episodes 
 "Games People Play" (90210)
 "The Games People Play" (The Apprentice)
 "Games People Play" (Crash Zone)
 "Games People Play" (Eureka)
 "Games People Play" (G.P.)
 "The Games People Play" (Holby City)
 "Games People Play" (Las Vegas)
 "Games People Play" (Life Is Wild)
 "Games People Play" (Modern Family)
 "Games People Play" (Party of Five)
 "Games People Play" (Perfect Strangers)
 "Games People Play!" (The Raccoons)
 "Games People Play" (Sex and the City)
 "Games People Play" (Soul Food)
 "Games People Play" (Tripper's Day)
 "Games People Play" (Tyler Perry's House of Payne)
 "Games People Play" (Webster)
 "Games People Play", an episode of Keep It in the Family

See also